The Hepatitis B Foundation (HBF) is an American nonprofit organization dedicated to finding a cure for hepatitis B and improving the lives of those already affected by the disease. Established in 1991, the foundation's headquarters is in Doylestown, PA. It is the only non-profit in the United States focused solely on hepatitis B. The foundation conducts biomedical research, promotes disease awareness, and acts as an information source for patients, the medical community, and the general public. The Hepatitis B Foundation's research arm, the Baruch S. Blumberg Institute, has the largest number of non-profit scientists dedicated to hepatitis B research in the world. The organization also leads national public policy initiatives and international public health programs.

History and organization

Founding 
The Hepatitis B Foundation was established in 1991 by a young couple, Joan and Tim Block. After Joan was diagnosed with hepatitis B at the age of 29, she and Tim encountered a lack of support and few resources to cope with the new diagnosis. To meet the unmet needs of those living with chronic hepatitis B, they created the Hepatitis B Foundation with the help of the other co-founders, Janine and Paul Witte. The first meetings of the foundation were held in their living room. Tim Block, a professor of virology at Thomas Jefferson University at the time, switched his research focus from herpesviridae to hepatitis B. He reached out to Baruch S. Blumberg, the Nobel prize winning discoverer of the hepatitis B virus, who invited Block to join him as a research fellow at Oxford University. Blumberg ultimately became a founding member of the Hepatitis B Foundation's research arm. Joan and Tim served in leadership roles throughout the growth of the organization. Joan Block served as executive director until retiring in 2017, while Tim Block remains as president of the foundation and its affiliated research arm, Baruch S. Blumberg Institute.

Organization and operations 
The Hepatitis B Foundation is a nonprofit organization that provides resources and information about hepatitis B, engages in public health outreach campaigns, and leads public policy initiatives. Their website acts as a resource for patients, the medical community, and general public to learn about the diagnosis and treatment of hepatitis B. Patient-centered support groups and trained counselors, who answer email and telephone questions, can be found on their website. Their website is available in 12 different languages, including Chinese, Hindi, Korean, and Vietnamese. For the medical community, the Hepatitis B Foundation organizes the International HBV Scientific Meeting annually for scientists discuss to new discoveries in hepatitis B research. The organization is also actively involved in policy-making, helping ensure hepatitis B is a health priority at the local and federal level.

The Baruch S. Blumberg Institute was established in 2003 by the Hepatitis B Foundation to conduct focused biomedical research on hepatitis B. Originally known as the Institute of Hepatitis and Virus Research, it was renamed in 2013 to honor its late co-founder and discoverer of the hepatitis B virus, Baruch S. Blumberg. The research institute contains the largest group of non-profit scientists in the United States working on hepatitis B research. In 2006, the Hepatitis B Foundation opened its first research facility on Delaware Valley College's campus to house the Baruch S Blumberg Institute. This research facility was recognized by the state as a Pennsylvania Keystone Innovation Zone. In 2006, the foundation built a research center to accommodate its expanding activities. This new center, called the Pennsylvania Biotechnology Center, presently acts as the headquarters for the Hepatitis B Foundation and Baruch S. Blumberg Institute. The Hepatitis B Foundation's biotechnology center has created over 700 jobs and brought in more than $1.8 billion to the Bucks County economic region between 2013 and 2015. In 2017, the foundation secured a $13 million grant to expand its Pennsylvania Biotechnology Center by 47,000 square feet, which will add 100 new jobs to its research facility.

References

External links
 

Medical and health foundations in the United States
Non-profit organizations based in the United States
Hepatitis B